Iona is a progressive rock album by Iona, released in 1990. This was the debut album from this group which progressed throughout occasional live appearances and an occasional appearance on record.

The recording process moved from place to place making good use of a number of studio facilities, including:
Studio 3, Leeds – (Engineer Steve Lea, Assisted by Rob Price)
Wildlife Studio, Ipswich – (Engineer Nigel Palmer)
The Field, Derbyshire – (Engineer Neil Costello)
Square One, Lancashire – (Engineer Steve Boyce-Buckley, Second Engineer Cliff Hewitt)
Cavalier Studio, Stockport – (Engineer John Harrison)

The recording was remastered for the 2002 release The River Flows: Anthology and later re-released on Open Sky Records as a standalone album.

Track listing
Turning Tide – 1:25 *
Flight of the Wild Goose – 6:00 *
The Island – 5:10 *
White Sands – 3:35
Dancing on the Wall – 4:32 *
A'mmachair – 5:29 *
Vision of Naran – 5:49 *
Beijing – 5:16
Iona – 3:43 *
Trilogy – 8:35 *
Here I Stand – 2:35
Columcille – 3:19

"*" indicates a track re-recorded for re-release in the Box Set and individual 2003 reissue. Times are for the original 1990 release.

Personnel

Iona
 Joanne Hogg – Vocals, Guitar, Keyboards
 Dave Bainbridge – Guitars, Piano, Keyboards, Tambourine
 Dave Fitzgerald – Saxophones, Flute, Piccolo, Chinese Flutes, Flageolet, Recorder, Irish whistle

Additional musicians
 Terl Bryant – Drums, Percussion
 Tim Hines – Percussion
 Tim Harries – Electric Bass, Double Bass
 Troy Donockley – Uilleann pipes
 Peter Whitfield – Violin, Viola
 Ian Thomas – Voice on Columcille

Release history
 1990, UK, What Records WHAR 1266, Release Date ? June 1990, LP
 1990, UK, What Records WHAD 1266, Release Date ? June 1990, CD
 1990, UK, What Records WHAC 1266, Release Date ? June 1990, Cassette
 1990, US, Forefront Records FFD-2700, Release Date ? June 1990, CD
 2003, UK, Open Sky Records OPENVP1CD, Release Date 3 November 2003, CD

References

Iona (band) albums
1990 debut albums